Soman is a chemical weapon.

Soman may also refer to:

 Soman, Iran, a village
 Soman (band)

People
 Bhaskar Sadashiv Soman (1913–1995), Indian naval officer
 Chitra Soman (born 1983), Indian athlete
 K. A. Soman (born 1953), artist from Kerala, India
 Milind Soman, Indian model
 M. G. Soman (1941–1997), Indian actor who appeared in Malayalam films
 Patricia Soman (born 1981), Côte d'Ivoire long jumper
 Soman Chainani, Indian-American filmmaker and writer

See also
 Somain (disambiguation)